Raymond Durr (born 1901, date of death unknown) was a French wrestler. He competed in the freestyle middleweight event at the 1924 Summer Olympics.

References

1901 births
Year of death missing
Olympic wrestlers of France
Wrestlers at the 1924 Summer Olympics
French male sport wrestlers
Place of birth missing